The 2018–19 TCU Horned Frogs women's basketball team represents Texas Christian University in the 2018–19 NCAA Division I women's basketball season. The 2018–19 season is head coach Raegan Pebley's fifth season at TCU. The Horned Frogs were members of the Big 12 Conference and played their home games in Schollmaier Arena. They finished the season 24–11, 10–8 in Big 12 play to finish in sixth place. They lost in the quarterfinals of the Big 12 women's tournament to Texas. They received an at-large bid to the Women's National Invitation Tournament where they defeated Prairie View A&M, UT Arlington, Arkansas in the first, second and third rounds, Cincinnati in the quarterfinals before losing to Arizona in the semifinals.

Roster

Schedule and results 

|-
!colspan=9 style=| Non-conference regular season

|-
!colspan=9 style=| Big 12 regular season

|-
!colspan=9 style=| Big 12 Women's Tournament

|-
!colspan=9 style=| WNIT

Schedule and results from GoFrogs.com

Rankings

See also 
 2018–19 TCU Horned Frogs men's basketball team

References 

TCU
TCU Horned Frogs women's basketball seasons
TCU